Scaptesyle buergersi is a moth in the subfamily Arctiinae first described by Max Gaede in 1926. It is found in Papua New Guinea.

References

Lithosiini